The 2017–18 The Citadel Bulldogs basketball team represented The Citadel, The Military College of South Carolina in the 2017–18 NCAA Division I men's basketball season. The Bulldogs were led by third-year head coach Duggar Baucom and played their home games at McAlister Field House as members of the Southern Conference, as they have since 1936–37. They finished the season 11–21, 5–13 in SoCon play to finish in eighth place. They defeated VMI in the first round of the SoCon tournament before losing in the quarterfinals to UNC Greensboro.

Previous season
The Bulldogs finished the 2016–17 season 12–21, 4–14 in SoCon play to finish tied  for eighth place. They lost in the quarterfinal d of the SoCon tournament to top-seeded UNC Greensboro after defeating Western Carolina.

Preseason

Departures
The Bulldogs saw four players complete their eligibility in 2016–17, three of whom graduated while the fourth was completing a graduate season.  Warren Sledge, Tom Koopman and Brian White graduated, while Bobby Duncan completed his final year of eligibility as a graduate student.  Four other players from the 2016–17 roster are not on the 2017–18 team: Ezekiel Balogun transferred to Eastern Florida State College, Aaron Washington transferred to Labette Community College, while Griffin Peevey and Chris Ross also are not on the roster.

Recruiting
Duggar Baucom and his staff signed six players to enter in 2017.

Roster
The Bulldogs roster will have no seniors and six freshmen.

Schedule and results
The Bulldogs played three games during a 10 day trip to Dominican Republic.  For the first time in many years, The Citadel and crosstown rival College of Charleston will not meet.

|-
! colspan=6 style=|Dominican Republic Exhibition Tour

|-
! colspan=8 style=|Exhibition

|-
! colspan=8 style=|Non-conference regular season

|-
! colspan=8 style=|Regular season

|-
! colspan="9" style=| SoCon tournament

References

The Citadel Bulldogs basketball seasons
Citadel
Citadel Bulldogs bask
Citadel Bulldogs bask